The Liberal Party, first known as the Constitutionalist Party, was a conservative, pro-French political party in Cambodia. The party was led by Prince Norodom Norindeth and was supported by the Khmer elites, the French, and members of the royal family. The party advocated an evolutionary approach for independence as opposed to their more radical rivals, the Democrats.

General election results

References

1946 establishments in Cambodia
1955 disestablishments in Cambodia
Cambodian democracy movements
Conservative parties in Cambodia
Defunct political parties in Cambodia
Political parties disestablished in 1955
Political parties established in 1946